State Route 168 (SR 168) is part of Maine's system of numbered state highways.  It runs  from an intersection with SR 6 in the town of Lee to U.S. Route 2 in Winn. It is known as Winn Road for its entire length.

Major junctions

References

External links

Floodgap Roadgap's RoadsAroundME: Maine State Route 168

168
Transportation in Penobscot County, Maine